Erik Gundersen (born 8 October 1959 in Esbjerg, Denmark) is a former motorcycle speedway rider in the late 1970s and 1980s. Gundersen is one of the most successful speedway riders of all time. He was the Speedway World Champion on three occasions, a two time Long Track World Champion, a five time World Pairs Champion, and a seven time World Team Cup winner with Denmark.

Gundersen won the World Pairs Championship a record five years in succession from 1985 to 1989, and won the World Team Cup a record six years in succession from 1983 to 1988. His 17 World Championship wins see him sit second for the most World Championships won.  Fellow Dane and Gundersen's long time Danish teammate Hans Nielsen holds the record with 22 World titles, though unlike Gundersen, Nielsen never won the Long Track World Championship.

Career
Gundersen rode for the Cradley Heathens from 1979 until 1989 when he almost died in a racing accident. He began his career at Cradley with Bruce Penhall but after Penhall's premature retirement in 1982, Gundersen became the club's number one rider – a position he held until his crash.

Gundersen first appeared in the Speedway World Championship Final in 1981 at Wembley Stadium where in front of 92,500 fans he finished 4th with 11 points. On the night he set a new 4 lap record for the  track of 66.8 seconds, a record that will stand forever as this was the last time that speedway was raced at the famous venue. His 1982 title chase ended on a sour note when he failed to qualify for the final held at the Los Angeles Memorial Coliseum after finishing a surprising 16th and last in the 1982 Intercontinental Final in Sweden. He made amends for his 1982 failure, easily qualifying for the 1983 World Final in West Germany where he would again finish in a strong 4th place.

Erik Gundersen would go on to win the World Championship three times: in 1984 at Ullevi in Gothenburg, Sweden, 1985 at the Odsal Stadium in Bradford, England, and lastly in 1988 at a packed to capacity Vojens Speedway Center in what was the first ever World Individual Final held in his home country of Denmark. Engine failure during the heats had stopped his chances of winning a 3rd championship in a row at the 1986 World Final in Poland, while he suffered the same fate in 1989 at the Munich Olympic Stadium in West Germany. He also finished second behind Hans Nielsen in the 2-day 1987 World Final at the Amsterdam Olympic Stadium.

Gundersen's career was ended just a few weeks after the 1989 World Final when he was involved in an accident whilst riding for Denmark at the Odsal Stadium on the 17 September 1989, in the World Team Cup final. Starting from the outside in Gate 4, he won the start but his motorcycle locked up on the first bend and he was knocked off by the rider behind. As he lay on the race track he was hit in the head by another rider's rear wheel. After the accident he was not expected to live and he remained in a coma for three days, but he eventually regained consciousness. He was then confined to a bed in hospital for the next month with grim prospects for resuming a normal life as doctors reported he had no neurological function below his neck. Gundersen defied the experts though and was determined to walk again. He had to learn to walk again and raised a large amount of money for the hospital which saved his life. He later went on to manage the Danish national speedway team.

During his career, Gundersen never finished off of the podium in the final of either the Speedway World Team Cup or the Speedway World Pairs Championship, though he was unable to take the podium of the 1989 World Team Cup in which Denmark finished in third place.

World final appearances

Individual World Championship
 1981 -  London, Wembley Stadium - 4th - 11pts
 1983 -  Norden, Motodrom Halbemond  - 4th - 10pts
 1984 -  Gothenburg, Ullevi - Winner - 14pts
 1985 -  Bradford, Odsal Stadium - Winner - 13pts + 3pts
 1986 -  Chorzów, Silesian Stadium - 10th - 7pts
 1987 -  Amsterdam, Olympic Stadium - 2nd - 24pts + 3pts
 1988 -  Vojens, Speedway Center - Winner - 14pts + 3pts
 1989 -  Munich, Olympic Stadium  - 4th - 11pts

World Pairs Championship
 1983 -  Gothenburg, Ullevi (with Hans Nielsen) - 3rd - 19pts (8)
 1984 -  Lonigo, Pista Speedway (with Hans Nielsen) - 2nd - 25pts (10)
 1985 -  Rybnik, Rybnik Municipal Stadium (with Tommy Knudsen) - Winner - 29pts (16)
 1986 -  Pocking, Rottalstadion (with Hans Nielsen) - Winner - 46pts (19)
 1987 -  Pardubice, Svítkov Stadion (with Hans Nielsen) - Winner - 52pts (26)
 1988 -  Bradford, Odsal Stadium (with Hans Nielsen) - Winner - 45pts (18)
 1989 -  Leszno, Alfred Smoczyk Stadium (with Hans Nielsen) - Winner - 48pts (20)

World Team Cup
 1981 -  Olching, Olching Speedwaybahn (with Ole Olsen / Hans Nielsen / Tommy Knudsen / Finn Thomsen) - Winner - 36pts (9)
 1982 -  London, White City Stadium (with Ole Olsen / Hans Nielsen / Preben Eriksen / Tommy Knudsen) - 2nd - 27pts (7)
 1983 -  Vojens, Speedway Center (with Ole Olsen / Hans Nielsen / Finn Thomsen / Peter Ravn) - Winner - 37pts (12)
 1984 -  Leszno, Alfred Smoczyk Stadium (with Bo Petersen / Preben Eriksen / Hans Nielsen) - Winner - 44pts (12)
 1985 -  Long Beach, Veterans Memorial Stadium (with Bo Petersen / Tommy Knudsen / Hans Nielsen / Preben Eriksen) - Winner - 37pts (10)
 1986 -  Gothenburg, Ullevi,  Vojens, Speedway Center and  Bradford, Odsal Stadium (with Hans Nielsen / Tommy Knudsen / Jan O. Pedersen / John Jørgensen) - Winner - 129pts (33)
 1987 -  Fredericia, Fredericia Speedway,  Coventry, Brandon Stadium and  Prague, Marketa Stadium (with Hans Nielsen / Jan O. Pedersen / Tommy Knudsen) - Winner - 130pts (33)
 1988 -  Long Beach, Veterans Memorial Stadium (with Hans Nielsen / Tommy Knudsen / Jan O. Pedersen / John Jørgensen) - Winner - 44pts (6)
 1989* -  Bradford, Odsal Stadium - (with Hans Nielsen / Gert Handberg / John Jørgensen / Brian Karger) - 2nd - 34pts (0)
* The 1989 Speedway World Team Cup final was where Gundersen suffered his career ending crash in turn 1 of Heat 1.

Individual Under-21 World Championship
 1978 -  Lonigo, Pista Speedway - 6th - 11pts
 1980 -  Pocking, Rottalstadion - 4th - 11+2pts

World Longtrack Championship

One Day Finals
 1984  Herxheim - Winner - 23pts
 1985  Esbjerg (N/S)
 1986  Pfarrkirchen - Winner - 25pts
 1987  Mühldorf - (7th) - 10pts

References

1959 births
Living people
Danish speedway riders
Individual Speedway World Champions
Speedway World Pairs Champions
Cradley Heathens riders
People from Esbjerg
Individual Speedway Long Track World Championship riders
Sportspeople from the Region of Southern Denmark